Daylight is a 2013 Dutch drama film based on the novel by .

Plot 
Lawyer, Iris Boelens, is a single mother and having regular problems with her autistic son Aaron. As her son gets suspended for a week, Iris asks her mom Ageeth for staying at their family house to recuperate. An aquarium technician, who drops by to take care of the tank, casually says that Aaron reminds him of her brother Ray. Iris is stressed because it's new info to her. Iris has been contracted by rich lady owner of Benschop enterprises to get her dissolute son off the hook involving production of child pornography. Iris further discovers that her brother was declared guilty of killing his wife Rosita and her baby Anna. Ray is an autistic man and had a bungled investigation which lead the judge to condemn him 20 years in correctional mental health. Iris, doggedly search for the truth about her brother's crime to get him new representation. She finds out Ray and Benschop's are related to her life more than she could've imagined and people are after her.

Cast 
 Derek de Lint - Twan Benschop
 Fedja van Huêt - Ray Boelens
 Monique van de Ven - Ageeth
  - Rosita
 Angela Schijf - Iris Boelens
  - Bo
 Thijs Römer - Peter Benschop
 Victor Löw - Lode
  - Sam Dijksman

See also
 Taped

External links 

2013 drama films
2013 films
Films directed by Diederik van Rooijen
Dutch drama films
2010s Dutch-language films